Humberto Alexis Trujillo Oramas (born 30 July 1965) is a Spanish former professional footballer who played as a central midfielder.

Playing career
Born in Las Palmas, Canary Islands, Trujillo was a penalty kick specialist. His 21-year professional career was closely associated with UD Las Palmas and Real Betis, and he appeared in more than 200 matches in both La Liga and Segunda División, eventually captaining both clubs.

Trujillo retired at the age of 39 after four seasons with another local side, Universidad de Las Palmas CF (the last three spent in the Segunda División B).

Coaching career
From 2004 to 2006, Trujillo acted as assistant manager at Andalusia's Betis who, under Lorenzo Serra Ferrer, qualified for the UEFA Champions League in the latter campaign. On 9 May 2017, he replaced the fired Víctor Sánchez at the helm of the first team, after having been working as a head scout. He drew each of the remaining fixtures of the season, starting with a 1–1 home result against Atlético Madrid.

Having worked as the club's sporting director, Trujillo was back as interim manager of Betis on 21 June 2020, when Rubi was dismissed with eight games to play.

Managerial statistics

Honours
Las Palmas
Segunda División: 1984–85

Betis
Copa del Rey runner-up: 1996–97

References

External links

Betisweb stats and bio 

1965 births
Living people
Spanish footballers
Footballers from Las Palmas
Association football midfielders
La Liga players
Segunda División players
Segunda División B players
UD Las Palmas players
CD Tenerife players
Real Betis players
Universidad de Las Palmas CF footballers
Spanish football managers
La Liga managers
Real Betis managers
Real Betis non-playing staff